Seyl Band is a village in Qaleh Biyaban Rural District, in the Central District of Darab County, Fars Province, Iran. At the 2006 census, its population was 233, in 49 families.

References 

Populated places in Darab County